Timea Judita Tătar (born 28 July 1989) is a Romanian handballer for Măgura Cisnădie.

Achievements 
Liga Naţională:
Gold Medalist: 2014
Silver Medalist: 2013, 2015, 2016, 2017

Cupa României:
Gold Medalist: 2013, 2014, 2015
Bronze Medalist: 2016

Supercupa României:
Winner: 2013, 2014, 2015

References

1989 births
Living people
Sportspeople from Baia Mare
Romanian female handball players
CS Minaur Baia Mare (women's handball) players